Heidi Johanna Hannula (born 26 February 1980 in Oulu) is a retired Finnish athlete who specialised in the sprinting events. She represented her country at the 2000 Summer Olympics, as well as three outdoor and one indoor World Championships.

Competition record

Personal bests
Outdoor
100 metres – 11.49 (+1.7 m/s) (Lahti 2000)
200 metres – 24.71 (-0.4 m/s) (Helsinki 1999)
Indoor
60 metres – 7.24 (Moscow 2006)

References

1980 births
Living people
Sportspeople from Oulu
Finnish female sprinters
Athletes (track and field) at the 2000 Summer Olympics
Olympic athletes of Finland
World Athletics Championships athletes for Finland
Universiade medalists in athletics (track and field)
Universiade gold medalists for Finland
Medalists at the 2007 Summer Universiade
Olympic female sprinters